AEJ may refer to:
Air Express, Tanzanian airline (former ICAO Code)
Association of European Journalists
A. E. J. Collins, prominent cricketer
African easterly jet
American Economic Journal, a group of four peer-reviewed academic journals in economics
Asia Europe Journal, a quarterly journal dedicated to publishing quality academic papers and policy discussions on common challenges facing Asia and Europe